Melipona seminigra, commonly known as uruçu-boca-de-renda (literally "laced-mouth uruçu" bee in Brazilian Portuguese), is a species of eusocial stingless bee in the family Apidae and tribe Meliponini.

References 

seminigra
Hymenoptera of South America
Hymenoptera of Brazil
Insects described in 1903